Coptodisca diospyriella is a moth of the family Heliozelidae. It was described by Vactor Tousey Chambers in 1874. It is found in North America, including Florida, Kentucky and Ohio.

The larvae feed on Diospyros species. They mine the leaves of their host plant.

References

Moths described in 1874
Heliozelidae